Nørre Galten Church is a Danish church located in Nørre Galten, Denmark. The church is located a few kilometres north of Hadsten, 12 kilometres south of Randers. The church was built in the 12th century.

Photos

References 

Churches in the Diocese of Aarhus
Lutheran churches converted from Roman Catholicism
Churches in the Central Denmark Region